ONE Pro Cycling was a British UCI Continental men's cycling team. Their first season was 2015, and they became a Professional Continental team in 2016. Due to funding issues, they reverted to Continental level in 2017.

History

ONE Pro Cycling was owned by retired professional cricketer Matt Prior and businessman Simon Chappell. The team officially launched on 17 February 2015, although started racing the week prior, at the opening race of the UK domestic road race season Prior stated that the team's aim was to join the UCI World Tour within five years. In November 2015 it was confirmed that the team had been granted a UCI Professional Continental licence for the 2016 season. In September 2018 the team announced that they would disband their men's squad at the end of the season in favour of entering the women's peloton the following year. One month later in October 2018 the team announced that they had scrapped plans to launch a women's team for the 2019 season, citing lack of sufficient sponsorship.

Major wins

2015
Perf's Pedal Race, Yanto Barker
Clayton Spring Classic, Peter Williams
Primavera Road Race, Marcin Białobłocki
Severn Bridge Road Race, George Harper
Eddie Soens Memorial Road Race, Peter Williams
Betty Pharoah Memorial Road Race, Marcin Białobłocki
Stage 1 Bałtyk–Karkonosze Tour, Peter Williams
 National Time Trial Championships, Marcin Białobłocki
2016
 National Time Trial Championships, Hayden McCormick
Stage 3 New Zealand Cycle Classic, Kristian House
The REV Classic, Dion Smith
Tro-Bro Léon, Martin Mortensen
Stage 1 Tour of Norway, Steele Von Hoff
Stage 2 Tour de Korea, Chris Opie
Stages 3 & 5 Tour de Korea, Karol Domagalski
Stage 7 Tour de Korea, Kristian House
Beaumont Trophy, Dion Smith
Stage 1 Sibiu Cycling Tour, Steele Von Hoff
2017
Stage 5 Szlakiem Walk Majora Hubala, Tom Stewart
Beaumont Trophy, Peter Williams
Stage 2 Kreiz Breizh Elites, James Oram
Grand Prix des Marbriers, Karol Domagalski
Overall Ronde van Midden-Nederland, Kamil Gradek
Stage 1, Team time trial
2018
Overall New Zealand Cycle Classic, Hayden McCormick
Poreč Trophy, Emīls Liepiņš
Stage 3 Istrian Spring Trophy, Emīls Liepiņš
Heistse Pijl, Emīls Liepiņš

National champions
2015
 Poland National Time Trial, Marcin Bialoblocki
2016
 New Zealand National Time Trial, Hayden Mccormick

Team roster

References

External links

Cycling teams based in the United Kingdom
UCI Continental Teams (Europe)
Cycling teams established in 2015
2015 establishments in the United Kingdom
Former UCI Professional Continental teams